Centerville Senior High School is a public high school located in Centerville, Indiana. It is the primary High School in the Centerville-Abington Community School Cooperation. The school serves students from the town of Centerville, Center Township, and Abington Township.

Facilities
The current high school building was built in 1961 with additions added in 1967,1976 and 1981. In 1994, the building was remodeled and up-dated. During the 2000–2002 school year, four new science rooms, a wellness center, and air conditioning were added.  The structure now includes 36 classrooms, 4 industrial arts areas, a home economic area, 2 gymnasiums, a guidance area, a swimming pool, an auditorium, 3 computer labs, 2 music areas, a library, a kitchen, and a cafeteria.

Athletics
Centerville High School competes in the  Tri-Eastern Conference. The Bulldogs have captured over 190 conference titles since joining in 1962. 

At the IHSAA State level, the Bulldogs have captured over 60 Sectional titles, 12 Regional titles, and been to 1 State Championship game.

See also
 List of high schools in Indiana

References

External links
 Official Website

Public high schools in Indiana
Educational institutions established in 1961
Schools in Wayne County, Indiana
1961 establishments in Indiana